Local elections were held in Malabon on May 13, 2013 as part of the Philippine general election. Several local posts in the city were on the ballot, including the mayor, vice mayor, one representative, and the twelve councilors for the city's two Sangguniang Panglungsod districts (six for each district).

Background 
Acting Mayor and former Vice Mayor Antolin Oreta III sought first full term as Mayor. Oreta became Mayor in 2012 when his uncle, then Mayor Canuto Oreta died. He ran unopposed.

Acting Vice Mayor and former Second District Councilor Diosdado "Dado" Cunanan sought first full term as vice mayor. He ran against incumbent First District Councilor Edwin Dimaguiba, incumbent Second District Councilor Eduardo "Eddie" Nolasco, ABC Pres. Paulo Oreta, son of the late Mayor Canuto Oreta, and Jeannie Ng-Sandoval, wife of former Representative Federico Sandoval II.

Incumbent Representative Josephine Veronique "Jaye" Lacson-Noel sought for her second term unopposed.

Results

Mayor 
Acting Mayor and former Vice Mayor Antolin Oreta III sought first full term as Mayor. Oreta became Mayor in 2012 when his uncle, then Mayor Canuto Oreta died. He ran unopposed.

Vice Mayor 
Acting Vice Mayor and former Second District Councilor Diosdado "Dado" Cunanan sought first full term as vice mayor. He ran against incumbent First District Councilor Edwin Dimaguiba, incumbent Second District Councilor Eduardo "Eddie" Nolasco, ABC Pres. Paulo Oreta, son of the late Mayor Canuto Oreta, and Jeannie Ng-Sandoval, wife of former Rep. Federico Sandoval II.

Representative, Lone District of Malabon 
Incumbent Rep. Josephine Veronique "Jaye" Lacson-Noel sought for her second term unopposed.

Councilor

First District

Second District

References 

Elections in Malabon
Malabon
2013 elections in Metro Manila